Alexander Zverev was the defending champion, but chose not to participate this year.

Damir Džumhur won his first ATP World Tour title, defeating Fabio Fognini in the final, 3–6, 6–4, 6–2. Džumhur became the first player from Bosnia and Herzegovina to win the ATP title.

Seeds
The top four seeds receive a bye into the second round.

Draw

Finals

Top half

Bottom half

Qualifying

Seeds

Qualifiers

Lucky loser
  Radu Albot

Qualifying draw

First qualifier

Second qualifier

Third qualifier

Fourth qualifier

References
 Main draw
 Qualifying draw

2017 Singles
2017 ATP World Tour